There are currently nine business routes of U.S. Highway 287 in Texas that are designated and maintained by the Texas Department of Transportation (TxDOT). The business routes in the US state of Texas are traditionally short spurs or loops that connect the main route, in this case, U.S. Highway  287 (US 287), to the center or commercial district of a city. The routes commonly follow the course of an decommissioned state highway, or the old course of the main route. Business routes are signed with the traditional US 287 highway shield, and with a small "business plate" placed above the marker. TxDOT regards business routes as official highways, and is responsible for the maintenance of the route.

As of 2010, there are nine official business routes of US 287. There are also two cancelled business routes, both of which were located in Amarillo. Of the nine routes, seven of them are located in Northeast Texas.

Facts
 Half of the eight routes are located in the DFW Metroplex.
 Unusually, six of the nine routes are designated as north–south, instead of the usual south–north.

Current routes

Grapeland

Business U.S. Highway 287-V (BUS US 287-V) is a short loop business route located almost entirely inside the city limits of Grapeland. The  highway is known as Main Street. The road passes directly through the center of Grapeland. The route was designated on January 20, 1977 as Texas State Highway Loop 531, but was changed to the current business route designation on September 26, 2003.

Major junctions

Corsicana

Business U.S. Highway 287-T (BUS US 287-T) is a very short spur business route located entirely in the city of Corsicana. The route passes a few warehouses and businesses in far southern Corsicana. The route was designated on January 28, 1987 as Texas State Highway Spur 565, but was changed to the current business designation on June 21, 1990. 

Major junctions

Mansfield–Fort Worth

Business US Highway 287-P (BUS US 287-P) is a  business loop of US Highway 287 in the US state of Texas that serves as main street for Mansfield, downtown Fort Worth and Saginaw. The highway is known as Main Street while in Mansfield, Mansfield Highway while in southern Fort Worth, Kennedale Parkway in Kennedale, Riverside Drive and Rosedale Street in central Fort Worth, Commerce Street in downtown Fort Worth, Main Street in northern Fort Worth, and Saginaw Boulevard in Saginaw. The highway was originally designated on December 17, 1970 as Texas State Highway Loop 496 (signed as a business route of US 81 and US 287, depending on the US Route that followed that corridor). On November 25, 1975, Loop 496 extended south to FM 157. On June 2, 1982, it extended to US 287. On June 21, 1990, Texas State Highway Loop 496 was changed to its current business route designation. On October 25, 1990, the section of BUS US 287-P in Meacham Field was cancelled. BUS US 287-P is located almost entirely in Tarrant County, and is mostly located in Fort Worth. On December 16, 2010, Business US 287-P was rerouted along I-35 and Spur 280 rather than along Commerce Street, Main Street, and Rosedale Street. On April 30, 2015, the section of BUS US 287-P from FM 917 to FM 157 was given to the city of Mansfield, and the section south of FM 917 became part of FM 917. BUS US 287-P was rerouted north along FM 157 to US 287. On July 27, 2017, FM 157 was rerouted south along FM 917 and US 287, completing the changes in the system. The highway is, as of 2010, the longest business route of US 287, while located in Texas. BUS US 287-P is one of the few highways to be designated as a north–south highway.

Vernon

Business U.S. Highway 287-F (BUS US 287-F) is a short loop business route located entirely in Vernon. The  highway is known as College Drive when concurrent with US 70, Hillcrest Drive as a stand-alone road, and Wilbarger Street while concurrent with Loop 488. Most of the route's course is concurrent with Loop 488, which passes directly through downtown Vernon. This was designated as Texas State Highway Spur 417 on October 15, 1965, but was changed to the current business designation on June 21, 1990.

Major junctions

Electra

Midlothian

Waxahachie

Former routes

Amarillo

This was redesignated from Loop 395 on June 21, 1990, only to revert to Loop 395 on October 25, 1990.

Amarillo

This was redesignated from Loop 362 on June 21, 1990, only to revert to Loop 362 on October 25, 1990.

See also

References

Texas Business
87-2B
87-2|287 Texas Business